Almese (Piedmontese: Almèis) is a comune (municipality) in the Metropolitan City of Turin in the Italian region Piedmont, located in the lower Val di Susa, about  west of Turin.

Twin towns – sister cities
Almese is twinned with:

  Szczyrk, Poland

References

External links
 Official website

Almese